Muslim chronicles for Indian history are chronicles regarding history of the Indian subcontinent written from Muslim perspective. The chronicles written in Arabic or Persian are valuable sources for Indian history.

This is a chronological list of major chronicles, authors and the region they cover.

See also 

Notes:

Dates: The dates are author's known or estimated dates. "r" indicates dates for the patron ruler.

References

Indian documents
Islam in Pakistan
Islam in India
Islamic Chroniclers